Frasca International, Inc. is a manufacturer of flight simulators located in the United States.  

Frasca may also refer to:

People with the surname 
 Curtis Frasca (born 1968), American entrepreneur, former CEO and co-founder of the company Verse Music Group
 Dominic Frasca (born 1967), American guitarist
 Erminio Frasca (born 1983), Italian sport shooter 
 Gabriel Frasca, American chef
 Gonzalo Frasca (born 1972), Uruguayan game designer
 Pauline Frasca (born 1980),  Australian two-time world champion rower
 Raffaele Frasca, Italian sports shooter
 Tony Frasca, (1927−1999), American ice hockey player and coach

Transportation 
 Frasca Field, airport located in Champaign County, Illinois